Augusta Memorial Park is a cemetery in Augusta, Arkansas.  It is located in the northeastern part of the city, accessible via Arkansas Highway 33B.  The cemetery was established in 1852, on what is reported by local historians to be a Native American burial mound.  The cemetery dates to the earliest period of the city's history, and is where many of its first settlers are buried.  The cemetery is roughly L-shaped, with the oldest, northwestern portion at the corner of the L.   A  section of the cemetery was listed on the National Register of Historic Places in 2003 for its historical associations.

Notable burials
 Billy Ray Smith Sr. (1935–2001), Professional football player

See also
 National Register of Historic Places listings in Woodruff County, Arkansas

References

External links
 
 

Cemeteries on the National Register of Historic Places in Arkansas
1852 establishments in Arkansas
National Register of Historic Places in Woodruff County, Arkansas
Mounds in Arkansas
Cultural infrastructure completed in 1852
Augusta, Arkansas
Cemeteries established in the 1850s